NH or Nh may refer to

Businesses and organizations
 All Nippon Airways (IATA code NH), formerly Nippon Helicopter, Japan's largest airline
 National Agricultural Cooperative Federation, a South Korean cooperative federation also known by its Korean initials NH (Nonghyup)
 New York, New Haven and Hartford Railroad
 NH (media company), formerly , a Dutch broadcasting company
 NH Hotel Group, formerly , a Spanish-based hotel chain
 NH Media ("Nam Hee"), a South Korean entertainment agency
 Nordsjælland Håndbold, a Danish handball team

Places
 New Hampshire, US (postal abbreviation NH)
 New Haven, a city in Connecticut, United States
 Noroton Heights, Connecticut, a town in Connecticut, United States
 North Holland, a province in the Netherlands
 Nowa Huta, a district of Kraków, Poland

In science and technology
 Nh (digraph), an orthographic concept
 National Hose Thread, a threaded connection standard used on hose couplings
 Nickel hydride, a type of rechargeable battery
 Nihonium, symbol Nh, a chemical element
 NH, molecular formula for imidogen

Other uses
 National Highway, a road designation in many countries
 NetHack, a computer game
 Nishan-e-Haider, a Pakistani military award
 No-hitter, a baseball term
 Niall Horan

See also